Mind transfer is a transfer of a biological mind to a computer.

Mind transfer may also refer to:

 Mind swap, a transfer of a biological mind to another biological body
 Mind Transfer (novel), a 1988 science fiction story by Janet Asimov

See also
 Reincarnation, a transfer of a soul to another body after death